Leus ramuli is a species of beetle in the family Cerambycidae, and the only species in the genus Leus. It was described by Henry Walter Bates in 1865.

References

Onciderini
Beetles described in 1865